Kirstenbosch is an important botanical garden nestled at the eastern foot of Table Mountain in Cape Town. The garden is one of 10  National Botanical Gardens covering five of South Africa's six different biomes and administered by the South African National Biodiversity Institute (SANBI). Prior to 1 September 2004, the institute was known as the National Botanical Institute.

Kirstenbosch places a strong emphasis on the cultivation of indigenous plants. When Kirstenbosch was founded in 1913 to preserve the flora native to the South Africa’s territory, it was the first botanical garden in the world with this ethos, at a time when invasive species were not considered an ecological and environmental problem.

The garden includes a large conservatory (The Botanical Society Conservatory) exhibiting plants from a number of different regions, including savanna, fynbos, karoo and others. Outdoors, the focus is on plants native to the Cape region, highlighted by the spectacular collections of proteas. It is a level IV  accredited Arboreta by the ArbNet Arboretum Accreditation Program and The Morton Arboretum.

History 
In 1660, by order of Jan van Riebeeck, a hedge of wild almond and brambles were planted to afford some protection to the perimeter of the Dutch colony. Sections of this hedge, named Van Riebeeck's Hedge, still exist in Kirstenbosch. The hedge is a Provincial Heritage Site. The area of the botanical garden was used for the harvesting of timber during this period.

The Kirsten part of the name is believed to be the surname of the manager of the land, J.F. Kirsten, in the 18th century. The bosch part of the name is a Dutch word for forest or bush.

The handover of ownership of the colony to Britain in 1811 brought changes in the use of the Kirstenbosch area. Two large land grants were made, with a Colonel Bird building a house, planting chestnut trees, and establishing a bath (still extant) fed by a natural spring. The Ecksteen family acquired the land in 1823, and it later came into the possession of the Cloete family (a well-known Cape lineage). Under their stewardship, the area was farmed more formally, being planted with oaks, fruit trees, and vineyards.

The land was thereafter purchased by Cecil Rhodes in 1895. After this point, the area became run-down, with large groups of pigs feeding on the acorns and wallowing in the pools. The famous Camphor Avenue was planted in 1898. The land now occupied by the Kirstenbosch Gardens was bequeathed to the nation by Rhodes, who died in 1902.

The history of the area as a botanical garden has its origin in Henry Harold Pearson, a botanist from Cambridge University who came to the Cape Colony in 1903 to take up a position as professor in the newly created chair of botany at the South African College (the predecessor of today's University of Cape Town.) In February 1911, Pearson visited the area of Kirstenbosch by cart to assess its suitability as a site for a botanical garden. On 1 July 1913, the area was set aside for this purpose by the government of the colony, with an annual budget of £1,000. No money was set aside for a salaried director's position, but Pearson accepted the position without pay. He lived in the gardens in difficult and reduced circumstances.

The task confronting Pearson was formidable. The area was overgrown, populated by wild pigs, overrun with weeds, and planted with orchards. Money was tight, and the budget was supplemented by the sale of firewood and acorns. Pearson commenced work in the area of Kirstenbosch known as "The Dell", planting cycads which are still visible there today.

Pearson died in 1916 from pneumonia. He was buried in his beloved garden, and his epitaph is still there today: "If ye seek his monument, look around". Since 1913, the garden has been successively administered by the Botanical Society of South Africa, the National Botanic Gardens of South Africa, the National Botanical Institute, and the South African Biodiversity Institute (SANBI) from 2004. The garden celebrated its centenary in 2013, issuing the commemorative book Kirstenbosch: The Most Beautiful Garden in Africa.

Research 

Kirstenbosch scientists, such as Winsome Barker, Graham Duncan, and John Manning, have published many scientific papers, books, and monographs on South African flora, including the Kirstenbosch Gardening Series. The gardens have also published a series of monographs, known sequentially as Memoirs of the Botanical Survey of South Africa, Annals of the Kirstenbosch Botanic Gardens, and Strelitzia.

Compton Herbarium 
The Compton Herbarium, which conducts research activities including identifying and describing new species, is located at the Kirstenbosch National Botanical Garden.

Purpose 
The herbarium is mainly geared toward studying the plant species of the winter rainfall region. Roughly 250,000 dried specimens are preserved here. Local and foreign botanists research proteas, heaths, amaryllis, and orchids. Conservationists, foresters, entomologists, and manufacturers of pesticides and fertilizers also participate in research here. A large library with relevant books is available for researchers.

History 
The Compton Herbarium was founded after the Bolus Herbarium moved from Kirstenbosch to the campus of the University of Cape Town. Prof. Robert Harold Compton, the second director of Kirstenbosch, kept a small herbarium in his office since 1937. In 1940, this was moved to where the Bolus Herbarium had once stood. Later, the Iziko South African Museum Herbarium and the Stellenbosch Government Herbarium were transferred here, as well. Since 1996, the collections have been based in a new, modern research complex.

South African Museum Herbarium 
This collection contains many valuable plants from all over the world; the oldest herbarium in the country, it is also one of the oldest in the Southern Hemisphere. In 1825, Danish botanist Christian Friedrich Ecklon brought 325 species to the museum. Dr. Karl Wilhelm Ludwig Pappe came into possession of the collection in 1855, and was appointed the first colonial botanist in the Cape in 1858. Pappe also built his own private herbarium and bought that of Karl Ludwig Philipp Zeyher. After Pappe's death, the Cape Colony government purchased the Pappe and Zeyher collections. Since 1956, the three herbaria have been housed at Kirstenbosch with the Compton Herbarium, but they remain a separate union. Only in 1988 did they become the property of the SANBI.

Stellenbosch Government Herbarium 
This herbarium was established by Dr. Augusta Vera Duthie in 1902. In 1960, it was donated to the state by the Stellenbosch University, and since then has been known under this name. In 1996, it was moved to Kirstenbosch and incorporated into the Compton Herbarium.

Chelsea Flower Show 
In 2008, the Kirstenbosch exhibit at the Chelsea Flower Show won a gold medal for the most creative display and the President's Cup (a new award by the Royal Horticultural Society president Peter Buckley to his favourite stand). The 2008 exhibit was the 16th designed by David Davidson and Raymond Hudson, which established South Africa "as a front runner in horticulture". The exhibit was entitled The Heat is On and featured an Aloidendron dichotomum (also known as a quiver tree), which is being studied and monitored as an indicator of climate change. Dead and dying quiver trees were displayed alongside live specimens to illustrate how warmer temperatures have forced the species to migrate southwards. Kirstenbosch has won 29 gold medals at the Chelsea Flower Show in 33 appearances.

Recreational use
Kirstenbosch enjoys great popularity with residents and visitors. From the gardens, several trails lead off along and up the mountain slopes, and these are much used by walkers and mountaineers. One of the trails, up a ravine called Skeleton Gorge, is an easy and popular route to the summit of Table Mountain. This route is also known as Smuts' Track after Prime Minister Jan Smuts, who used this route regularly. On the slopes above the cultivated parts of the garden, a contour path leads through forests to Constantia Nek to the south. The same contour path can be followed to the north for quite a distance, and it takes the hiker past the Rhodes Memorial to the slopes of Devil's Peak and beyond.

Kirstenbosch regularly exhibits Zimbabwean stone sculptures in the gardens. Many of the artists are associated with Chapungu Sculpture Park in Zimbabwe.

In summer, a popular series of outdoor concerts is held in the gardens on Sunday evenings. Many well-known local artists such as the Cape Town Philharmonic Orchestra, Johnny Clegg, The Parlotones, Ike Moriz, Arno Carstens, Goldfish, an Mango Groove have performed here. In recent years, several international performers such as Michael Bublé and Cliff Richard have also held concerts on the Kirstenbosch stage.

Recognition 
In 2015, the International Garden Tourism Awards Body declared Kirstenbosch Botanical Gardens the International Garden of the Year.

South African National Biodiversity Institute 
In 1951, the Botanical Research Institute (BRI) was created from the Division of Botany, Pretoria, and in turn, became the National Botanical Institute (NBI) in 1989. In 2004, the National Botanical Institute was absorbed into a broader configuration, the SANBI, by the National Environmental Management: Biodiversity Act (NEMBA). Since 1921, NBI has published a scientific botanical journal, Bothalia. In 2014, it was renamed Bothalia – African Biodiversity and Conservation to reflect the broader scope of SANBI.

Gallery

See also 
 Cape Floristic Region

References

Bibliography

External links 

 Official website from SANBI 
 Kirstenbosch entry at Botanical Gardens Conservation International
 Description and history of Kirstenbosch at the University of Wisconsin
 Botanical Society of South Africa
 Kirstenbosch Conservatory: Kay Bergh Bulb House

Botanical gardens in South Africa
Parks in Cape Town
Natural history of Cape Town
Protected areas of the Western Cape
Protected areas established in 1913
1913 establishments in South Africa
Tourist attractions in Cape Town
Newlands, Cape Town
Herbaria in Africa